Sigma Lambda Pi was an officially non-sectarian and  historically Jewish fraternity founded in 1915 at New York University. It stopped operations in 1932 as chapters either closed, became locals or merged with Phi Epsilon Pi.

Chapters
 Alpha - New York University - 1915 (inactive 1922)
 Delta - New York College of Dental and Oral Surgery - 1920 (inactive 193x)
 Phi - Fordham University - 1920 (inactive 1930)
 Kappa - Columbia University - 1920 (inactive 1932)
 Theta - West Virginia University - 1921 (inactive 1925)
 Beta - University of Pennsylvania - 1922 (inactive 1932)
 Rho - Western Reserve University - 1923 (inactive 1930)
 Mu - University of Michigan - 1923 (inactive 1925)
 Zeta - Boston University - 1924 (merged 1932)
 Gamma - Muhlenberg College - 1926 (merged 1932)
 Omicron - Ohio State University - 1927 (merged 1932)
 Tau - Rider University - 1930 (inactive 19xx)
 name? - Bryant University - 1935

Dissolution
In 1932 the fraternity disintegrated.
 The chapters at Boston, Muhlenberg, and Ohio State joined Phi Epsilon Pi. The Baird's archive explains that at the time, these were the last three active chapters.
 The Columbia chapter dissolved
 The branch at Rider College became a local, being allowed to retain the name Sigma Lambda Pi.

Later, the Rider chapter granted a charter to the Bryant and Stratton Commercial College in Providence, Rhode Island.

Symbols
The badge of Sigma Lambda Pi was in the shape of an arch with a crown surmounting it. The Arch had 7 pearls, the Crown 10 pearls and Sapphire at the top. Exposed Gold was nugget finished, and the letters were gold on a background of gold. Colors were Sapphire Blue and Gold. The Open motto was "Dum Vivimus Fratres Vivamus" whose English translation is  "while we live, let us live as brothers". The flower was the Carnation.

See also
 List of Jewish fraternities and sororities

References

Historically Jewish fraternities in the United States
Student organizations established in 1915
1932 disestablishments in the United States
1915 establishments in New York (state)
Defunct former members of the North American Interfraternity Conference